Jugnoo ; (English:firefly)  was a 2015 Pakistani romantic drama serial. It is based on the novel Shehzori by Mirza Azeem Baig Chughtai. It was originally aired on Hum TV on Fridays, 8:00 pm. The series is directed by Farooq Rind and produced by Momina Duraid. It stars Yumna Zaidi and Zahid Ahmed in lead roles.

Synopsis
The series narrates the story of a young and fun-loving girl Jugnoo (Yumna Zaidi) who lost her father at an early age. She along with her mother Shah Jahan, lives with her maternal aunt Jahangir (Ismat Zaidi). Despite facing troubles and hardships in her life, Jugnoo maintains a confident and jolly nature.

Cast
 Yumna Zaidi as Jugnoo
 Zahid Ahmed as Zulfi
 Rehan Sheikh as Baba Sahab 
 Ismat Zaidi as Aapa Jahangir
 Laila Zuberi as Ghazala's Mother
 Saad Azhar as Tanveer
 Mehreen Raheel as Ghazala
 Saman Ansari as Ayesha
 Faheem Azam as Doctor Sadi
 Humaira Bano as Jugnoo mother
 Malik Raza as Bakshi Jee
 Aqeel Abbas as Imran (Ammu)

Reception
The drama was widely lauded due to its comic touch and glimpse. It was one of the highest rated dramas of the channel during its run. However, some critics labelled the show as having a baseless plot.

References

External links
 Official Hum Tv Website
 Official Playlist on Youtube
 Official Playlist on Dailymotion
 Official Facebook Page

Hum TV original programming
Urdu-language television shows
Pakistani drama television series
2015 Pakistani television series debuts
2014 Pakistani television series endings